Global Television or Global TV may refer to:

 Global Television Network, a major English-language television network in Canada
 CanWest Global, its former corporate owner 
 Global News, its news division
 Global Television (Australia), an Australia-based television production company
 Global TV (T&T), a television station in Trinidad and Tobago
 Global TV (Venezuela), a regional television station in Venezuela, serving the state of Zulia
 Global News Network, a news channel in the Philippines shown on the Global Destiny Cable line up
 GTV (Indonesia), formerly Global TV, a television network in Indonesia
 Global Television, a television channel in Bangladesh.
 Red TV (Peru), formerly Global Televisión, a television network in Peru

See also
 China Global Television Network, a government-owned broadcaster based in China
 Global Broadcasting, a television broadcaster based in Rhode Island
 Rede Globo, a television network in Brazil